The Swedish Committee for Afghanistan (SCA, SAK) is a Swedish non-governmental foreign aid organisation active in Afghanistan. The organisation was formed in 1980, as a reaction to the Soviet invasion. The SCA  has been active in Afghanistan since 1982. The SCA is politically and religiously neutral with a goal to help Afghanistan to become a peaceful and stable country where human rights are respected, rural communities are empowered and all Afghans have the right and opportunity to democratic participation in the governance of their country.

The SCA's work encompasses programmes for education, health, support to persons with disabilities and rural development. There are also support units for all programme activities relating to quality assurance, civil society, human rights, gender and information. SCA has more than 6 000 employees, of whom more than 99 percent are Afghans. SCA's main target group is the rural population, specifically women, girls and persons with disabilities. Operations include capacity building, advocacy and service delivery. The work is always conducted in close cooperation with the local population. The main administrative office in Afghanistan is located in the capital of Kabul. Field operations are carried out in 17 provinces organised from five regional offices in Mazar-i-Sharif, Taloqan, Ghazni, Jalalabad and Wardak.

References 

Commitment for Change, Strategic plan 2014-2017]

SCA Annual Report 2015

Organizations established in 1980
Development charities based in Sweden
Foreign charities operating in Afghanistan
Organisations based in Kabul
Afghanistan–Sweden relations